Fairfield is an unincorporated community in Bedford County, Tennessee, United States.

Fairfield was platted about 1830. A post office called Fairfield was established in 1842, and remained in operation until 1905.

References

Unincorporated communities in Bedford County, Tennessee
Unincorporated communities in Tennessee